Prishtina International Airport Adem Jashari, also referred to as Pristina International Airport, is an international airport in Prishtina, Kosovo. The airport has flights to numerous European destinations.

The airport is the only port of entry for air travelers to Kosovo. It is named in honor Adem Jashari, the founder of the Kosovo Liberation Army. Pristina International Airport serves as an operating base for Eurowings from Germany and, formerly, Adria Airways from Slovenia.

History
The airport was originally built as Slatina Air Base, containing the second-largest military underground hangar complex in Yugoslavia. 

From 12 to 26 June 1999, there was a brief but tense stand-off between NATO and the Russian Kosovo Force in which Russian troops occupied the airport. A contingent of 200 Russian troops deployed in Bosnia and Herzegovina then crossed into Kosovo and occupied the airport in Pristina, the capital city of Kosovo.

The apron and the passenger terminal were renovated and expanded in 2002 and again in 2009. In June 2006, Pristina International Airport was awarded the Best Airport 2006 Award by Airports Council International (ACI). Winning airports were selected for excellence and achievement across a range of disciplines including airport development, operations, facilities, security and safety, and customer service.

On 12 November 2008, Pristina International Airport received for the first time in its history the annual one-millionth passenger (excluding military). A special ceremony was held at the airport where the one-millionth passenger received a free return ticket to a destination of his choice served by the airport.

In late 2010, the airport was renamed from Pristina International Airport to Pristina International Airport Adem Jashari, the founder of the Kosovo Liberation Army, which fought for the secession of Kosovo from the Federal Republic of Yugoslavia during the 1990s.

Due to the ongoing dispute between Serbia and Kosovo, flights to and from Pristina International Airport are impacted by the refusal of ATC in Serbia, namely SMATSA, to allow overflights via Serbian airspace. This ultimately results in flight paths avoiding Serbian territory with flights to Pristina having to enter via Albanian or Macedonian airspace. This dispute can generally add up to 30 minutes to a flight duration and discussions to overcome this dispute have so far failed. Being the only operational airport in the immediate region, any diversions would ultimately have to go to either North Macedonia, Albania,  or Bulgaria, given that the Gjakova Airport is still a closed facility.

Airlines and destinations

The following airlines operate regular scheduled and charter flights to and from Pristina:

Statistics

Ground transportation

Car 
The airport is linked with the M-9 motorway, which connects with the R7 motorway.

Taxi 
Taxis from the airport to Pristina are available.

Bus 
The airport can be reached from the city center, via the 1A bus route, which departs from the Prishtina Bus Station every two hours.

Accidents and incidents
 On November 12, 1999, Si Fly Flight 3275 crashed while approaching the airport after a flight from Rome International Airport, killing all 24 occupants.
 On January 19, 2006, a Slovak Air Force, Antonov, An-24 crashed over Hungary after departing from Pristina International Airport. (See, 2006 Slovak Air Force Antonov-24 Crash)

See also
Transport in Kosovo
Gjakova Airport in Gjakova
Batlava-Donja Penduha Airfield in Dumosh

Notes and references

Notes

References

External links

 
Civil Aviation Authority of Kosovo

Airports in Kosovo
1965 establishments in Yugoslavia
Airports established in 1965
Buildings and structures in Pristina
Transport in Pristina District